The High Court is the second highest court of law in the Marshall Islands Judiciary. The court is established by Article VI, section 3 of the republic's constitution It has appellate jurisdiction over cases originating in the lower courts as well as original jurisdiction over certain classes of cases, including some criminal and civil matters, wills, and divorces. The court consists of a Chief Justice and an optional number of Associate Justices. The current Chief Justice, Carl Ingram, a U.S. citizen who originally came to the Marshall Islands with the Peace Corps in 1979, was first appointed as an associate justice of the High Court in March 2003, then as chief justice in October 2003 and for a second 10-year term as chief justice effective October 2013.

Chief Justices

References

Marshall Islands
Law of the Marshall Islands